Kosti may refer to:

Places
Kosti, Sudan, a major city in Sudan
Kosti, Burgas Province, a village in Bulgaria

People

Given name 
Kosti Katajamäki (born 1977), Finnish rally driver
Kosti Manubi, South Sudanese politician
Kosti Vehanen (1887–1957), Finnish pianist and composer

Family name 
Eleni Kosti (born 1985), Greek swimmer
María Kosti (born 1951), Spanish actress
Melpo Kosti, Greek television and soap opera actress

Others
Kushti (or Kusti), a string-like garment which pairs with the Sudreh in Zoroastrianism

See also
Costi (disambiguation)
Kostis (disambiguation)